The 1947 CCNY Beavers football team was an American football team that represented the City College of New York (CCNY) as an independent during the 1947 college football season. In their eleventh season under Harold J. Parker, the Beavers team compiled a 2–5–1 record.

Schedule

References

CCNY
CCNY Beavers football seasons
CCNY Beavers football